The 1996 United States presidential election in Hawaii took place on November 5, 1996, as part of the 1996 United States presidential election. Voters chose 4 representatives, or electors to the Electoral College, who voted for president and vice president.

Hawaii was won by President Bill Clinton (D) over Senator Bob Dole (R-KS), with Clinton winning 56.93% to 31.64% by a margin of 25.29%. Billionaire businessman Ross Perot (Reform Party of the United States of America-TX) finished in third, with 7.6% of the popular vote.

Results

By county

References

Hawaii
1996
1996 Hawaii elections